The men's long jump at the 2013 World Championships in Athletics was held at the Luzhniki Stadium on 14–16 August.

Records
Prior to the competition, the records were as follows:

Qualification standards

Schedule

Results

Qualification
Qualification: Qualifying performance 8.10 (Q) or at least 12 best performers (q).

Final

The final was started at 19:30.

References

External links
Long jump results at IAAF website

Long jump
Long jump at the World Athletics Championships